Robert White (died 1761) was a Scottish minister who served as the Bishop of Dunblane (1735–43), Bishop of Fife (1743–61) and Primus of the Scottish Episcopal Church (1757–61).

He was the son of Charles White, a Dundee merchant, and Susanna Douglas, daughter of the Right Reverend Robert Douglas, Bishop of Dunblane. After his education at the University of Oxford, he was ordained sometime between 1709 and 1716. His first pastoral appointment was as the Incumbent of Essie, Glamis (c. 1716–32). His next two appointments were as Curate (1732–33) and then Incumbent (1733–61) of Cupar.

In 1735, he was chosen to be the Bishop of Dunblane, but David Freebairn, Primus of the Church,  refused to confirm the election. Despite this, he was consecrated at Carsebank, Forfar on 24 June 1735 by bishops Thomas Rattray, William Dunbar and Robert Keith. He was translated to the bishopric of Fife on 26 October 1743. He was also elected Primus of the Scottish Episcopal Church in 1757.

He died in office on 16 August 1761.

References

Bibliography

 
 

Year of birth unknown
1761 deaths
Bishops of Dunblane
Bishops of Fife
Primuses of the Scottish Episcopal Church
Alumni of the University of Oxford